Miriti may be,

Miriti River
Miriti language
One of the common names for Mauritia flexuosa